Vahandeh (also Romanized as Vahendeh and Vahndeh; also known as Vahneh and Wahīndah) is a village in Kharqan Rural District, in the Central District of Razan County, Hamadan Province, Iran. At the 2006 census, its population was 168, in 44 families.

References 

Populated places in Razan County